Hoseyniyeh-ye Khazir (also Romanized as Ḩoseynīyeh-ye Khazīr and Ḩoseynīyeh-ye Kheẕayer) is a village in Azadeh Rural District, Moshrageh District, Ramshir County, Khuzestan Province, Iran. At the 2006 census, its population was 294, in 37 families.

References 

Populated places in Ramshir County